Thomas Perrin (born 27 October 1928) is an Australian former cricketer. He played two first-class cricket matches for Victoria between 1950 and 1951.

See also
 List of Victoria first-class cricketers

References

External links
 

1928 births
Living people
Australian cricketers
Victoria cricketers
Cricketers from Melbourne